No Kids is a Canadian indie pop band from Vancouver, British Columbia.

History
The band was formed by Justin Kellam, Julia Chirka and Nick Krgovich following the departure of Larissa Loyva from their earlier band P:ano.

The band's debut album, Come Into My House, was released February 19, 2008 on Tomlab. They toured Canada and the United States through the spring and summer of 2008 in support of the record. The album was given a generally favourable rating on Metacritic.

The band contributed to a compilation album, Friends in Bellwoods II, in 2009, and toured with the band Mount Eerie and Tara Jane O’Neil. They then released an EP, Judy At The Grove, in 2010.

Discography
 Come Into My House (2008)
 Judy At The Grove EP (2010)

Compilations
 Friends in Bellwoods II (2009): "All That Heaven Allows"

References

External links
 No Kids on Myspace

Musical groups established in 2008
Musical groups from Vancouver
Canadian indie pop groups
2008 establishments in British Columbia